Vgo, or Ugo, for "Hugues", was a stonemason active in Provence during the twelfth century. He left his signature on several Romanesque religious edifices in Provence and mainly in Tricastin:

 Vaison Cathedral
 Notre Dame d'Aubune
 St Blaise de Bauzon
 St Sepulchre Chapel in Beaumont
 Crypt of Apt Cathedral

He is not to be confused with Master Hugo, an English artist of the same century.

References 
 Révoil, Henri. Architecture Romane du Midi de la France. Paris: Morel, 1874. Vols. 2 and 3. Folio. 123 plates. Sold as a collection of prints. Mainly engravings with a few chromolithographs.
 Rouquette, Jean Marie. Provence Romane. MCMLXXIV, Zodiaque La Nuit des Temps

12th-century sculptors
French male sculptors
12th-century French people
Romanesque artists
12th-century French artists